Streptococcus orisratti is a species of oral Streptococcus bacteria first isolated from Sprague–Dawley rats, hence its name. Its type strain is A63T (=ATCC 700640T).

References

Further reading

External links

LPSN
Type strain of Streptococcus orisratti at BacDive -  the Bacterial Diversity Metadatabase

Streptococcaceae
Bacteria described in 2000